Hexagonal ferrites or hexaferrites are a family of ferrites with hexagonal crystal structure. The most common member is BaFe12O19, also called barium ferrite, BaM, etc. BaM is a strong room-temperature ferrimagnetic material with high anisotropy along the c axis. All the hexaferrite members are constructed by stacking a few building blocks in a certain order.

Basic building blocks

S block 
The S block is very common in hexaferrites, which has a chemical formula of MeS6O82+. MeS are smaller metal cations, for example, Fe and other transition metals or noble metals. The S block is essentially a slab cut along the  plane of an AB2O4 spinel. Each S block has one A layer and one B layer. The A layer features MeS-centered tetrahedron and MeS-centered octahedron, while the B layer is made up of edge-sharing MeS-centered octahedron. Both A and B layers have the same chemical formula of MeS3O42+.

R block 

The R block has a chemical formula of MeLMeS6O112-. MeL are larger metal cations, for example, alkaline earth metals (Ba, Sr,) rare earth metals, Pb, etc. The large metal cations are located in the middle layer of the three hexagonally packed layers. This block is also composed of face-sharing MeS-centered octahedra and MeS-centered trigonal bipyramids.

T block 
The T block has a chemical formula of MeL2MeS8O142-. One T block consists of 4 oxygen layers with the two MeL atoms substituting two oxygen atoms in the middle two layers. In one T block, there are both MeS-centered octahedra and MeS-centered tetrahedra.

Family nembers

M-type ferrite 
M-type ferrite is made up of alternating S and R blocks in the sequence of SRS*R*. (* denotes rotating that layer around the c axis by 180°.) The chemical formula of M-type ferrite is MeLMeS12O19. Common examples are BaFe12O19, SrFe12O19. It exhibits  space group symmetry. For BaFe12O19, a = 5.89 Å and c = 23.18 Å. M-ferrite is a very robust ferrimagnetic material, thus widely used as fridge magnets, card strips, magnets in speakers, magnetic material in linear tape-open.

W-type ferrite 
W-type ferrite, like the M-type, consists of S and R blocks, but the stacking order and the number of blocks are different. The stacking sequence in a W-ferrite is SSRS*S*R* and its chemical formula is MeLMeS18O27. It exhibits  space group symmetry. One example of W-type ferrite is BaFe18O27, with a = 5.88 Å and c = 32.85 Å.

R-type ferrite 
Unlike other hexaferrites, R-type ferrite doesn't have an S block. Instead, it only has single B layers extracted from the S block. The stacking sequence is BRB*R*.

Y-type ferrite 
One example is Ba2Co2Fe12O22 with a = 5.86 Å and c = 43.5 Å. Y-type ferrite is built up with S and T blocks with an order of 3(ST) in one unit cell. There is no horizontal mirror plane in a Y-type ferrite.

Z-type ferrite 
It has a complicated stacking of SRSTS*R*S*T* in one unit cell. Some Z-type members may have sophisticated magnetic properties along different directions. One example is Ba3Co2Fe24O41 with a = 5.88 Å and c = 52.3 Å.

X-type ferrite 
The stacking order is 3(SRS*S*R*) in one unit cell. One example is Sr2Co2Fe28O46 with c = 83.74 Å.

References 

Ferromagnetic materials
Ceramic materials